The 1989 CONCACAF Champions' Cup was the 25th edition of the CONCACAF Champions' Cup, the premier football club competition organized by CONCACAF, the regional governing body of North America, Central America, and the Caribbean.

UNAM won the final 4–2 on aggregate for their third CONCACAF club title.

Format
The teams were split in two zones, North/Central American and Caribbean, (as North and Central American sections combined to qualify one team for the final), each one qualifying the winner to the final tournament. All the matches in the tournament were played under the home/away match system.

North/Central American Zone

Preliminary round 

Coke Milpross won 4–1 on aggregate.

América won 3–1 on aggregate.

First round

North American series

UdeG won 8–1 on aggregate.

UNAM won 7–3 on aggregate.

Central American series

La Previsora won 9–2 on aggregate.

Plaza Amador won 5–2 on aggregate.

Central American group stage
Group 1

Group 2

Second round

North/Central American series

UdeG won 6–5 on aggregate.

UNAM won 10–0 on aggregate.

Central American group stage

Third round

UNAM won 6–1 on aggregate; advanced to the fourth round.

Herediano won 3–2 on aggregate; advanced to the fourth round.

Fourth round

UNAM won 6–2 on aggregate; advanced to the final.

Caribbean Zone

First round

1–1 on aggregate. L'Étoile de Morne-à-l'Eau won 7–6 on penalties.

2–2 on aggregate. Rivière-Pilote won 4–3 on penalties.

Réveil Sportif won 4–2 on aggregate.

Second round

||colspan="2" 
|}Rivière-Pilote advanced to the third round.Third round

||colspan="2" 
|}Rivière-Pilote advanced to the fourth round.Group

Fourth roundPinar del Río won 3–2 on aggregate.Final

First leg

Second legUNAM won 4–2 on aggregate.''

References

1
CONCACAF Champions' Cup
c